Allen County is a county located in the U.S. state of Kentucky. As of the 2020 census, the population was 20,588. Its county seat is Scottsville. The county is named for Colonel John Allen, a state senator and soldier who was killed leading the 1st Regiment of Kentucky Rifleman at the Battle of Frenchtown, Michigan during the War of 1812. Allen County practices the prohibition of alcohol and is a completely dry county. It was formed in 1815 from parts of Barren and Warren counties. Allen County is included in the Bowling Green, KY Metropolitan Statistical Area.

History
Allen County was established in 1815 from land given by Barren and Warren counties. A courthouse fire in 1902 resulted in the loss of some county records.

Geography

Adjacent counties

Demographics

As of the census of 2000, there were 17,800 people, 6,910 households, and 5,113 families residing in the county. The racial makeup of the county was 97.62% White, 1.07% Black or African American, 0.16% Native American, 0.12% Asian, 0.01% Pacific Islander, 0.36% from other races, and 0.66% from two or more races.  0.83% of the population were Hispanic or Latino of any race.

There were 6,910 households, out of which 34.10% had children under the age of 18 living with them, 60.60% were married couples living together, 9.80% had a female householder with no husband present, and 26.00% were non-families. 23.10% of all households were made up of individuals, and 10.40% had someone living alone who was 65 years of age or older.  The average household size was 2.55 and the average family size was 2.99.

In the county, the population was spread out, with 25.80% under the age of 18, 8.90% from 18 to 24, 28.50% from 25 to 44, 23.10% from 45 to 64, and 13.70% who were 65 years of age or older.  The median age was 36 years. For every 100 females there were 95.90 males.  For every 100 females age 18 and over, there were 93.30 males.

The median income for a household in the county was $31,238, and the median income for a family was $36,815. Males had a median income of $27,587 versus $22,659 for females. The per capita income for the county was $14,506.  About 13.20% of families and 17.30% of the population were below the poverty line, including 23.40% of those under age 18 and 20.40% of those age 65 or over.

Politics
Allen County, like most of Kentucky, is increasingly solidly Republican, although it was like those counties to its east in Appalachia never a part of the "Solid South". The last Democrat to carry the county in a Presidential election was Woodrow Wilson in 1912, although a number of other elections have given Democrat majorities as recently as the 1999 gubernatorial election.

Voter Registration

Statewide Elections

Communities

City
 Scottsville (county seat)

Unincorporated communities
 Adolphus
 Allen Springs
 Alonzo
 Amos
 Butlersville
 Cedar Springs
 Chapel Hill
 Clare
 Fleet
 Forest Springs
 Gainesville
 Halfway
 Halifax
 Holland
 Maynard
 Meador
 Mount Aerial
 Mount Zion
 New Roe
 Oak Forest
 Petroleum
 Pope
 Red Hill
 Rodemer
 Settle
 Trammel
 Yesse

Notable residents
 Mordecai Ham, an evangelist born in Allen County
 Jim McDaniels
 Charles Napier (actor)
 Norro Wilson
 Cal Turner Sr.

See also

 National Register of Historic Places listings in Allen County, Kentucky
List of counties in Kentucky

References

 
1815 establishments in Kentucky
Populated places established in 1815
Kentucky counties